This list is of the Cultural Properties of Japan designated in the category of  for the Prefecture of Miyagi.

National Cultural Properties
As of 1 July 2019, four Important Cultural Properties  (including one *National Treasure) have been designated, being of national significance.

Prefectural Cultural Properties
As of 1 May 2019, twelve properties have been designated at a prefectural level.

See also
 Cultural Properties of Japan
 List of National Treasures of Japan (historical materials)
 List of Historic Sites of Japan (Miyagi)
 List of Cultural Properties of Japan - paintings (Miyagi)
 Mutsu Province
 Tōhoku History Museum

References

External links
  Cultural Properties in Miyagi Prefecture

Cultural Properties,historical materials
Historical materials,Miyagi